Mariano Escobedo Municipality is a municipality in Veracruz, Mexico. It is located in central zone of the State of Veracruz, about 127 km from state capital Xalapa. It has a surface of 103.64 km2.

Borders
Mariano Escobedo Municipality is delimited to the north by Puebla State, to the east by Atzacan Municipality and Ixtaczoquitlán Municipality, to the south by Orizaba Municipality, Maltrata Municipality and Ixhuatlancillo Municipality and to the west by Puebla State.

Products
It produces principally maize, beans, potatoes, sugarcane and coffee.

Events
In Mariano Escobedo Municipality, in march takes place the celebration in honor to Saint Joseph, chief of the town.

Weather
The weather in  Mariano Escobedo  is very cold all year with rains in summer and autumn.

References

External links 

  Municipal Official webpage
  Municipal Official Information

Municipalities of Veracruz